Ishkhan ("prince"; 18831915), born Nikoghayos Mikayelian, and also known as Nigol, was an Armenian fedayi, a member of the Armenian Revolutionary Federation. Along with Aram Manukian and Arshak Vramian, he was a leading figure in Van just before and during the early stages of World War I. He was well known for arming Armenian villages in eastern Anatolia and organizing their defences to defend themselves from attacks and raids by Turks and Kurds. He was killed on 17 April 1915 just before the Turks besieged Van.

References

1881 births
1915 deaths
Armenian fedayi
Armenian nationalists
Armenian people of World War I
People who died in the Armenian genocide
Armenians from the Ottoman Empire